John Bach (born 5 June 1946) is a British-born New Zealand actor who has acted on stage, television and film over a period of more than four decades. Though born in the United Kingdom, he has spent most of his career living and working in New Zealand.

International audiences are most likely to have seen Bach as the Gondorian Ranger Madril in the second and third movies of The Lord of the Rings film trilogy (2001–2003). His leading roles in New Zealand television include playing the titular Detective Inspector John Duggan in the Duggan telemovies and television series, one of the truckdriving brothers in series Roche,  and time on long-running soap opera Close to Home. In 1992 he starred as Scottish inventor Alexander Graham Bell in the telemovie The Sound and the Silence. In 1999 he played the Earl of Sackville in an episode of the TV miniseries A Twist in the Tale.

Bach's Australian work includes science fiction series Farscape,  playing Mike Power in based on a true story mini-series The Great Bookie Robbery (1986), and as Sir Ian Hamilton in the 2015 TV miniseries Gallipoli.

In 2010 Bach appeared in NZ science fiction series This Is Not My Life as the sinister Harry Sheridan, as magistrate Titus Calavius in Spartacus: Blood and Sand and in an episode of Legend of the Seeker. 

He has also appeared in several New Zealand films, including Utu, Carry Me Back, Goodbye Pork Pie, The Last Tattoo, Pallet on the Floor, Old Scores (in which he had a central role), and Beyond Reasonable Doubt.

In 2014 he performed as body double for Saruman in place of Christopher Lee, who was unable to fly to New Zealand for principal photography on The Hobbit film series.

He appeared as the Roman Emperor Marcus Aurelius in the first season of the 2016 Netflix drama series,  Roman Empire.

Note
Bach's surname is pronounced "Baitch", and not as in the Welsh language pronunciation of the word for small, from which it is derived.

External links

1946 births
Living people
New Zealand male television actors
New Zealand male film actors
Welsh emigrants to New Zealand
Welsh male television actors
Welsh male film actors
20th-century New Zealand male actors
20th-century Welsh male actors
21st-century New Zealand male actors
21st-century Welsh male actors